The Thompson R2-J School District is located in Loveland, Colorado and covers territory in Loveland, Berthoud, a southern section of Fort Collins and portions of Windsor, Johnstown and unincorporated parts of Larimer, Weld and Boulder counties. It is the 17th largest school district in Colorado, serving more than 15,000 students within 33 schools (18 elementary, 5 middle, 5 high, 2 PK-8 and 2 charter).

Schools

High schools

Berthoud High School
Harold Ferguson High School
Loveland High School
Mountain View High School
Thompson Valley High School

PK-8 Schools 
Riverview School
High Plains School

Middle schools
Bill Reed Middle School
Conrad Ball Middle School
Lucile Erwin Middle School
Turner Middle School
Walt Clark Middle School

Elementary schools
Berthoud Elementary School
B. F. Kitchen Elementary School
Big Thompson Elementary School
Carrie Martin Elementary School
Centennial Elementary School
Cottonwood Plains Elementary School
Coyote Ridge Elementary School
Garfield Elementary School
Ivy Stockwell Elementary School
Laurene Edmondson Elementary School
Lincoln Elementary School
Mary Blair Elementary School
Monroe Eementary School
Namaqua Elementary School
Ponderosa Elementary School 
Sarah Milner Elementary School
Truscott Elementary School
Winona Elementary School

Charter schools
New Vision Charter School (K-8)
Loveland Classical

See also
 List of school districts in Colorado

References

External links

School districts in Colorado
Loveland, Colorado
Education in Larimer County, Colorado